Norway competed at the 1988 Winter Olympics in Calgary, Alberta, Canada. This was the first and only time at the Winter Olympics that Norway failed to win a gold medal.

Medalists

Competitors
The following is the list of number of competitors in the Games.

Alpine skiing

Men

Men's combined

Biathlon

Men

Men's 4 x 7.5 km relay

 1 A penalty loop of 150 metres had to be skied per missed target.
 2 One minute added per missed target.

Cross-country skiing

Men

 C = Classical style, F = Freestyle

Men's 4 × 10 km relay

Women

 C = Classical style, F = Freestyle

Women's 4 × 5 km relay

Ice hockey

Group B
Top three teams (shaded ones) entered the medal round.

 Soviet Union 5-0 Norway
 West Germany 7-3 Norway
 Czechoslovakia 10-1 Norway
 USA 6-3 Norway
 Austria 4-4 Norway

Game for 11th place

|}

Team roster
Jarl Eriksen
Vern Mott
Cato Tom Andersen
Morgan Andersen
Tor Helge Eikeland
Åge Ellingsen
Tommy Skaarberg
Truls Kristiansen
Kim Søgaard
Petter Salsten
Jørgen Salsten
Arne Billkvam
Stephen Foyn
Jarle Friis
Rune Gulliksen
Geir Hoff
Roy Johansen
Erik Kristiansen
Ørjan Løvdal
Sigurd Thinn
Petter Thoresen
Marius Voigt
Lars Bergseng
Head coach: Lennart Åhlberg

Nordic combined 

Men's individual

Events:
 normal hill ski jumping 
 15 km cross-country skiing 

Men's Team

Three participants per team.

Events:
 normal hill ski jumping 
 10 km cross-country skiing

Ski jumping 

Men's team large hill

 1 Four teams members performed two jumps each. The best three were counted.

Speed skating

Men

Women

References

Official Olympic Reports
International Olympic Committee results database
 Olympic Winter Games 1988, full results by sports-reference.com

Nations at the 1988 Winter Olympics
1988
Winter Olympics